"Bailar pegados" ("Dancing Closely") is a song recorded by Spanish singer Sergio Dalma, written by Julio Seijas and Luis Gómez Escobar. It is best known as the  entry at the Eurovision Song Contest 1991, held in Rome.

Background
The song is a romantic ballad in which Dalma sings: "dancing closely is dancing like the sea dances with the dolphins / heart to heart in just one ballroom". Dalma also recorded the song in French as "Danser contre toi" and Italian as "Ballare stretti".

Eurovision
The song was performed nineteenth on the night, following 's Clouseau with "Geef het op" and preceding 's Samantha Janus with "A Message to Your Heart". At the close of voting, it had received 119 points, placing 4th in a field of 22.

It was succeeded as Spanish entry at the 1992 contest by Serafín Zubiri singing "Todo esto es la música".

In 2008, the song was named the best Spanish Eurovision entry of all time at the Europasión special show organized by Televisión Española.

Charts

Weekly charts

Year-end charts

External links

 Official Eurovision Song Contest site, history by year, 1991.
 Detailed info and lyrics, The Diggiloo Thrush, "Bailar pegados".

Eurovision songs of Spain
Eurovision songs of 1991
1991 songs
Latin ballads